Huta (meaning "foundry" or "glass production shop" in Slavic languages) may refer to:

Settlements

Belarus

Brest Oblast
 Huta, Baranavichy District
 Huta, Brest District
 Huta, Hantsavichy District
 Huta, Drahichyn District
 Huta, Lyakhavichy District
 Huta, Pruzhany District

Gomel Oblast
 Huta, Vetka District
 Huta, Rahachow District

Grodno Oblast
 Huta, Ashmyany
 Huta, Voranava village, Voranava
 Huta, Palyatskishki village, Voranava

Minsk Oblast
 Huta, Berezan District
 Huta, Valozhyn District
 Huta, Krupki District
 Huta, Uzda District

Mogilyov Oblast
 Huta, Levyadzanka village, Byalynichy District
 Huta, Tsyakhtsin village, Byalynichy District
 Huta, Kirawsk District
 Huta, Klimavichy District

Vitebsk Oblast
 Huta, Pastavy District
 Huta, Talachyn District
 Huta, Ushachy District

Poland
 Nowa Huta, a steel-producing district in the east of Kraków
 Huta, Lower Silesian Voivodeship (south-west Poland)
 Huta, Bydgoszcz County in Kuyavian-Pomeranian Voivodeship (north-central Poland)
 Huta, Tuchola County in Kuyavian-Pomeranian Voivodeship (north-central Poland)
 Huta, Lipno County in Kuyavian-Pomeranian Voivodeship (north-central Poland)
 Huta, Rypin County in Kuyavian-Pomeranian Voivodeship (north-central Poland)
 Huta, Chełm County in Lublin Voivodeship (east Poland)
 Huta, Krasnystaw County in Lublin Voivodeship (east Poland)
 Huta, Kraśnik County in Lublin Voivodeship (east Poland)
 Huta, Augustów County in Podlaskie Voivodeship (north-east Poland)
 Huta, Gmina Filipów in Podlaskie Voivodeship (north-east Poland)
 Huta, Gmina Suwałki in Podlaskie Voivodeship (north-east Poland)
 Huta, Bełchatów County in Łódź Voivodeship (central Poland)
 Huta, Pajęczno County in Łódź Voivodeship (central Poland)
 Huta, Piotrków County in Łódź Voivodeship (central Poland)
 Huta, Wieruszów County in Łódź Voivodeship (central Poland)
 Huta, Gmina Baranów in Lublin Voivodeship (east Poland)
 Huta, Gmina Wąwolnica in Lublin Voivodeship (east Poland)
 Huta, Włodawa County in Lublin Voivodeship (east Poland)
 Huta, Świętokrzyskie Voivodeship (south-central Poland)
 Huta, Ciechanów County in Masovian Voivodeship (east-central Poland)
 Huta, Lipsko County in Masovian Voivodeship (east-central Poland)
 Huta, Przysucha County in Masovian Voivodeship (east-central Poland)
 Huta, Radom County in Masovian Voivodeship (east-central Poland)
 Huta, Szydłowiec County in Masovian Voivodeship (east-central Poland)
 Huta Zaborowska, gmina Gostynin, Masovian voivodeship
 Huta, Żuromin County in Masovian Voivodeship (east-central Poland)
 Huta, Czarnków-Trzcianka County in Greater Poland Voivodeship (west-central Poland)
 Huta, Kalisz County in Greater Poland Voivodeship (west-central Poland)
 Huta, Ostrów Wielkopolski County in Greater Poland Voivodeship (west-central Poland)
 Huta, Złotów County in Greater Poland Voivodeship (west-central Poland)
 Huta Szklana, Greater Poland Voivodeship
 Huta, Chojnice County in Pomeranian Voivodeship (north Poland)
 Huta, Słupsk County in Pomeranian Voivodeship (north Poland)
 Huta, Warmian-Masurian Voivodeship (north Poland)

Romania
 Huta, a village in Boianu Mare Commune, Bihor County
 Huta, a village in Chiuiești Commune, Cluj County
 Huta, a village in Buciumi, Sălaj

Ukraine
There are at least 90 populated places in Ukraine that carry name of Huta or its derivatives.

Cherkasy Oblast
 Huta Mezhyritska, Cherkasy Raion

Chernihiv Oblast
 Huta, Novhorod-Siverskyi Raion

Ivano-Frankivsk Oblast
 Huta, Ivano-Frankivsk Raion

Khmelnytskyi Oblast
 Huta, Derazhnia urban hromada, Khmelnytskyi Raion
 Huta, Vinkivtsi urban hromada, Khmelnytskyi Raion
 Huta, Shepetivka Raion

Kyiv Oblast
 Huta, Bila Tserkva Raion

Lviv Oblast
 Huta, Chervonohrad Raion
 Huta, Drohobych Raion
 Huta, Zolochiv Raion
 Huta Obedynska, Lviv Raion
 Huta Oleska, Zolochiv Raion, now Hutyshche

Rivne Oblast
 Huta, Kostopil Raion

Sumy Oblast
 Huta, Hlukhiv Raion

Vinnytsia Oblast
 Huta, Nemyriv Raion

Volyn Oblast
 Huta, Ratne Raion

Zakarpattia Oblast
 Huta, Uzhhorod Raion

Lakes
 Huta, Pruzhany Raion, Brest Voblast
 Huta, Rechytsa Raion, Homel Voblast

See also
 Stara Huta (disambiguation)
 Nowa Huta (disambiguation)
 Huty, several toponyms in Ukraine and Slovakia
 
 
 Guta (disambiguation)